William John Vukovich III (August 31, 1963, Fresno, California, United States – November 25, 1990, Bakersfield, California, United States) was an American race car driver. He was a three-time starter of the Indianapolis 500. The grandson of two-time Indianapolis 500 winner Bill Vukovich and the son of Bill Vukovich II, Vukovich III was the 1988 Indianapolis 500 Rookie of the Year. Billy Vukovich  III was killed in practice for a CRA race at Mesa Marin Raceway, in Bakersfield, California, when his throttle stuck open which caused his car to swerve into the wall. He was 27 years old.

Vukovich became the first third-generation driver to qualify in Indy 500 history. His grandfather was killed while leading the 1955 Indianapolis 500.

He got his start in racing driving for the John Runjavac racing team.

Motorsports career results

American open–wheel results
(key) (Races in bold indicate pole position)

CART/Indy Car

Indy 500 results

References

External links

 

1963 births
1990 deaths
American people of Serbian descent
American racing drivers
Champ Car drivers
Indianapolis 500 drivers
Indianapolis 500 Rookies of the Year
Sportspeople from Fresno, California
Racing drivers from Fresno, California
Racing drivers from California
Racing drivers who died while racing
Sports deaths in California
USAC Silver Crown Series drivers